Paska can refer to:
 Paska (bread), a traditional easter bread in Ukraine
 Paska (singer), a Finnish a cappella rock singer
 Paska, Germany, a municipality in Thuringia, Germany
 Pavol Paška, a Slovak politician
 Paska, a Finnish profanity
 An alternative name of the card game Paskahousu

See also
 Pasca, a town in Colombia
 Paksha, a lunar phase in the Hindu calendar
 Paskha, a Slavic festive dish